Hubert Mitchell Rankin  was Provost of St Ninian's Cathedral, Perth for a brief period in 1935. A former Rector of Montrose, he died in 1935. His younger son was John Rankin.

References

Year of birth unknown
Provosts of St Ninian's Cathedral, Perth
1935 deaths